This list comprises Swansea City A.F.C. players who have attained a full international cap whilst playing for Swansea. Players who gained their first international cap after leaving Swansea are not included.

Players

Key to positions
 GK — Goalkeeper
 DF — Defender
 MF — Midfielder 
 FW — Forward

Notes

References

External links

National Football Teams

Players
Association football player non-biographical articles
Swansea City F.C.
Swansea